Hydrolagus mitsukurii is a species of fish in the family Chimaeridae found in China, Japan, South Korea, the Philippines, Taiwan, and possibly Indonesia. Its natural habitat is open seas. It is one of several species commonly called "spookfish".

References

mitsukurii
Taxa named by David Starr Jordan
Taxa named by John Otterbein Snyder
Fish described in 1904
Taxonomy articles created by Polbot